L. maritimus may refer to:
 Lathyrus maritimus, a pea species
 Lotus maritimus, a deervetch species

See also
 Maritimus (disambiguation)